The SVAM CA-80 is a non-rigid airship built by the Shanghai Vantage Airship Manufacture Co. in China.

According to the makers, this is the first blimp totally designed and manufactured by Chinese engineers. It has been certified as a grade A Hi-Tech introduction program [No. 20000186] in Shanghai in 2000 and it had a successful trial flight in September 2001. The CAAC authority has granted a type design approval and certificate of airworthiness for this model of airship. Two airships of this model have been successfully produced and purchased by the Dalian General Aviation Company. 

The CA-80 began commercial operation from Oct. 2005 by Vantage Airship.

References

 vantageship.com retrieved 2008-07-10

Airships of China
2000s Chinese civil utility aircraft